The Australian referendum of 12 December 1906 approved an amendment to the Australian constitution related to the terms of office of federal senators. Technically it was a vote on the Constitution Alteration (Senate Elections) Bill 1906, which after being approved in the referendum received the royal assent on 3 April 1907. The amendment moved the date of the beginning of the term of members of the Senate from 1 January to 1 July so that elections to the federal House of Representatives and the Senate could occur simultaneously.

The 1906 vote was the first referendum ever held in the Commonwealth of Australia and concerned the first amendment proposed to the constitution since its enactment. The referendum was held in conjunction with the 1906 federal election.

Overview

Prior to the amendment the constitution provided, in section 13, that Senate term would begin on 1 January and end on 31 December. By 1906 it was felt to be unlikely that Senate terms would generally coincide with House of Representatives terms, and that for this reason a change would be beneficial. The proposed amendment provided for Senate terms to begin on 1 July and end on 30 June. Odger's Australian Senate Practice noted that the main reason for the change was to enable simultaneous elections to be held in March, which at the time was considered the most likely period in which Federal elections would be held. The amendment was uncontroversial, dealing with the mechanical matter of how to rotate Senate terms, and Robert Menzies later observed that

as the average voter ... does not care how frequently a Senator rotates, the amendment was carried.

Although the amendment has not hindered the holding of simultaneous elections, it has had one unintended consequence. Because two-thirds of Commonwealth elections have been held in the months between September and December, there have been numerous instances of incoming Senators being required to wait many months before taking their seats. Those elected on 3 October 1998, for instance, were required to wait 270 days before doing so, and those elected on 21 August 2010 were required to wait 314 days before doing so.

Referendum results 
Question: Do you approve of the proposed law for the alteration of the Constitution entitled 'Constitution Alteration (Senate Elections) 1906'?

Changes to the text of the constitution
Section 13 - (removed text stricken through; substituted text in bold):

As soon as may be after the Senate first meets and after each first meeting of the Senate following a dissolution thereof, the Senate shall divide the senators chosen for each State into two classes, as nearly equal in number as practicable and the places of the senators of the first class shall become vacant at the expiration of the third year three years, and the places of those of the second class at the expiration of the sixth year six years, from the beginning of their term of service and afterwards the places of senators shall be vacant at the expiration of six years from the beginning of their term of service.

The election to fill vacant places shall be made in the year at the expiration of which within one year before the places are to become vacant.

For the purpose of this section the term of service of a senator shall be taken to begin on the first day of January July following the day of his election, except in the cases of the first election and of the election next after any dissolution of the Senate, when it shall be taken to begin on the first day of January July preceding the day of his election.

See also
Referendums in Australia
Politics of Australia
History of Australia

References

Further reading
 .
 Australian Electoral Commission (2007) Referendum Dates and Results 1906 – Present AEC, Canberra.
 

! colspan="3" style="border-top: 5px solid #cccccc" | Amendments to the Constitution of Australia
|-
| style="width: 30%; text-align: center;" | Commonwealth of AustraliaConstitution Act (1900)

| style="width: 30%; text-align: center;" | 2nd amendment1st State Debts amendment (1910)

1906 referendums
Amendments to the Constitution of Australia
1907 in law
1906 elections in Australia
Constitutional referendums in Australia
December 1906 events